Nanuet is a train station in Nanuet, New York, serving Metro-North Railroad and NJ Transit trains on the Pascack Valley Line. Its official address is 1 Prospect Street, but in reality, it is located on Orchard Street West, diagonally off the southwest corner of Prospect Street and Middletown Road.

The station originated as a lumberyard known as Red Tavern and operated by David Demarest. In 1846, the station was upgraded and renamed Clarkstown. The station was renamed in 1856 to Nanuet, four years after ticketed service began. The station depot built by the Erie Railroad for its New Jersey and New York Railroad and its main line (later Piermont Branch), burned on March 14, 1991.

History

The station at Nanuet began as a location for the pickup of ties for the New York and Erie Railroad in 1839. Known as Red Tavern, the location was run by David Demarest. At the location would board thirty-five men to help move the ties up the line.

By 1849, Demarest was named the station agent at Red Tavern and the station was renamed as Clarkstown. Demarest also used this occasion to construct two steam locomotives. The depot constructed at Clarkstown was part of Demarest's house, constructed in 1849.  No tickets were sold at Clarkstown until 1852, and then the details were written in ink by Demarest himself. In 1856, the station was renamed Nanuet after a local Native American chief. Demarest remained in charge of the Nanuet station until his death in 1881, at which point his son, Joseph, took over as station agent.

Station layout
The station has one track and one low-level side platform.

There are three parking lots available at Nanuet. Free permit parking is available for residents of the Town of Clarkstown at the station's closest parking lot. Permits are issues by the Town Clerk of the Town of Clarkstown. The lot accommodates 339 vehicles. Paid parking (either daily, or by permit) is available at the Metro-North parking facility, which is operated by LAZ Parking and accommodates 226 vehicles. The lot is located behind the Nanuet post office. A third parking facility operated by the town can accommodate 229 vehicles. The lot located west of the station and does not require payment or resident permit.

In April 2022, a new train shelter was installed with a bench named after transportation advocate Orrin Getz. The new shelter contains Help Points, USB charging and LED lights.

Bibliography

References

External links

 Station from Prospect Avenue from Google Maps Street View
 Nanuet Post Cards and Other Images (including Nanuet Erie Railroad Station) (Daniel Silverman)

NJ Transit Rail Operations stations
Railway stations in Rockland County, New York
Former Erie Railroad stations
Railway stations in the United States opened in 1841
1841 establishments in New York (state)